Psary may refer to:

Psary, Góra County in Lower Silesian Voivodeship (south-west Poland)
Psary, Legnica County in Lower Silesian Voivodeship (south-west Poland)
Psary, Oława County in Lower Silesian Voivodeship (south-west Poland)
Psary, Trzebnica County in Lower Silesian Voivodeship (south-west Poland)
Psary, a village in Silesian Voivodeship (S Poland)
Psary, Kuyavian-Pomeranian Voivodeship (north-central Poland)
Psary, Łowicz County in Łódź Voivodeship (central Poland)
Psary, Opoczno County in Łódź Voivodeship (central Poland)
Psary, Poddębice County in Łódź Voivodeship (central Poland)
Psary, Skierniewice County in Łódź Voivodeship (central Poland)
Psary, Chrzanów County in Lesser Poland Voivodeship (south Poland)
Psary, Świętokrzyskie Voivodeship (south-central Poland)
Psary, Kozienice County in Masovian Voivodeship (east-central Poland)
Psary, Płock County in Masovian Voivodeship (east-central Poland)
Psary, Pułtusk County in Masovian Voivodeship (east-central Poland)
Psary, Koło County in Greater Poland Voivodeship (west-central Poland)
Psary, Ostrów Wielkopolski County in Greater Poland Voivodeship (west-central Poland)
Psary, Turek County in Greater Poland Voivodeship (west-central Poland)
Psary, Będzin County in Silesian Voivodeship (south Poland)
Psary, Lubliniec County in Silesian Voivodeship (south Poland)
Psary, West Pomeranian Voivodeship (north-west Poland)